Andrew John Edwards (born 28 March 1965) is a Welsh former professional footballer who played as a winger. He made over 100 appearances in the English Football League for Wrexham, winning their Young Player of the Season award in the 1984–85 season.

He also went on to play for Morecambe in non-league.

References

1965 births
Living people
Welsh footballers
Association football wingers
Wrexham A.F.C. players
Morecambe F.C. players
English Football League players
Footballers from Wrexham